The women's 20 kilometres walk event at the 1999 Pan American Games was held on July 26.

Results

References

Athletics at the 1999 Pan American Games
1999
1999 in women's athletics